Glaros (Γλάρος, "seagull") or Glaronisi (Γλαρονήσι) is an island that belongs to the Lesser Cyclades. Glaros is extremely small, flat, uninhabited and nearly barren. This island can be visited from Koufonisi only with a special arrangement with any of the local boatsmen. There are around five small rocky islets off the east coast of Glaros.

Uninhabited islands of Greece
Lesser Cyclades
Landforms of Naxos (regional unit)
Islands of the South Aegean
Islands of Greece